The Air (Prevention and Control of Pollution) Act, 1981 is an Act of the Parliament of India to control and prevent air pollution in India. The law was amended in 1987. This was the first attempt by the government of India to combat air pollution.

See also
Air pollution in India
Indian Council of Forestry Research and Education
List of Indian federal legislation

References

External links
Text of the Act

Acts of the Parliament of India 1981
Air pollution in India